Granulina parilis is a species of minute sea snail, a marine gastropod mollusk in the family Granulinidae.

Distribution
This species is endemic to São Tomé and Príncipe.

References

 Gofas S. & Fernandes F. 1988. The marginellids of São Tomé, West Africa. Journal of Conchology 33(1): 1–30, pls. 1–2.

Granulinidae
Endemic fauna of São Tomé and Príncipe
Invertebrates of São Tomé and Príncipe
Gastropods described in 1988
Taxonomy articles created by Polbot